Nevvare Hanım ("young blessing" or "young child"; born Ayşe Çıhçı, after 1926 Nevvare Leyla Sönmezler; 4 May 1901 – 13 June 1992) was the fourth consort of Sultan Mehmed VI of the Ottoman Empire.

Early life
Nevvare Hanım was born on 4 May 1901 in Derbent, Ottoman Empire. Born as Ayşe Çıhçı, she was a member of Abkhazian noble family, Çıhçı. Her father was Mustafa Bey Çıhcı, and her mother was Hafize Hanım Kap-Ipha. 

As a young child, she had been sent to live-in Mehmed's Çengelköy mansion when he had been a prince, where after sometime she became a lady-in-waiting to her aunt Müveddet Kadın. Here her name according to the custom of the Ottoman court was Nevvare. She was also a close friend of princess Leyla Achba. Nevvare was very beautiful and tall, with green eyes and long black hair.

First marriage

Mehmed noticed Nevvare among the ladies of Müveddet and fell in love with her. Nevvare married Mehmed on 20 June 1918 in the Dolmabahçe Palace, although Müveddet was opposed in every way. Mehmed was fifty seven, while Nevvare was seventeen years old. Nevvare remained childless. After Mehmed's accession to the throne on 4 July 1918, She was given the title of "Senior Ikbal", although she would have been entitled to the title of Third Kadın. He probably did not receive the title so as not to further offend Müveddet. She was given a mansion on the grounds of the Yıldız Palace. Her close friend Leyla descrived her as kind but very proud.

After Mehmed's deposition in 1922, he was sent into exile in San Remo. She, like rest of the family members, was imprisoned in Feriye Palace. During their stay in the Feriye, Nevvare became so sick that she had to be taken to a hospital. She wasn't issued a passport, and it was decided that she should join the others once she felt a little better. Nevvare managed to sneak out disguised as Kalfa. And so on 6 March 1924, her parents took her to her hometown in Derbent. After she regained her health, she wrote to the Sultan, and asked him for a divorce. And so she was granted divorce on 20 May 1924.

Second marriage
In 1926, Nevvare married a trader named Mevlüd Bey Sönmezler and change her name in Leyla Hanım, in honor of her old friend Leyla Achba. They first settled in Ferenyolu, then in Derbent. In 1940, widowed, she settled in Şişli.

Death
In the 1970s she bought a house in Derbent, where she had been born, and lived there until her death. Nevvare died on 13 June 1992 at the age of ninety-one in Derbent, and was buried in a cemetery in Derbent.

See also
Ikbal (title)
Ottoman Imperial Harem
List of consorts of the Ottoman sultans

References

Sources

1901 births
1992 deaths
Emigrants from the Ottoman Empire to Italy
Remarried royal consorts
People from the Ottoman Empire of Abkhazian descent
Nevvare